Zoology is a bimonthly peer-reviewed scientific journal covering zoology that was established in 1886. It is published by Elsevier and the editor-in-chief is Thomas G. C. Bosch (University of Kiel).

According to the Journal Citation Reports, the journal has a 2018 impact factor of 1.669.

See also
 List of zoology journals

References

External links
 

Zoology journals
Publications established in 1886
Bimonthly journals
Elsevier academic journals
English-language journals